The EAU Arvada Bridge was a Parker through truss bridge located near Arvada, Wyoming, which carried Sheridan County Road CN3-38 across the Powder River. The bridge was built in 1917 by the Monarch Engineering Company of Denver. When nominated to the National Register of Historic Places in 1982, it was one of only two Parker through truss bridges remaining in Wyoming.

The bridge was added to the National Register on February 22, 1985. It was one of several bridges added to the NRHP for its historic role in Wyoming bridge construction. The bridge was replaced in 1990.

See also
DMJ Pick Bridge, now the only Parker truss bridge remaining in Wyoming
List of bridges documented by the Historic American Engineering Record in Wyoming

References

External links

Road bridges on the National Register of Historic Places in Wyoming
Bridges completed in 1917
Buildings and structures in Sheridan County, Wyoming
Historic American Engineering Record in Wyoming
National Register of Historic Places in Sheridan County, Wyoming
Steel bridges in the United States
Parker truss bridges in the United States